This is a partial list of recipients of the Presidential Medal of Freedom, listed chronologically within the aspect of life in which each recipient is or was renowned.

The Presidential Medal of Freedom is awarded by the president of the United States "for especially meritorious contribution to (1) the security or national interests of the United States, or (2) world peace, or (3) cultural or other significant public or private endeavors." Honorees are selected by the president or recommended to them by the Distinguished Civilian Service Awards Board.

Background 
Typically the medal is bestowed upon the recipient by the sitting president who has chosen them. However, the first recipients selected by President John F. Kennedy before his assassination were formally awarded by his successor in office, Lyndon B. Johnson.

President Barack Obama awarded 123 medals, the most ever, followed by President Ronald Reagan with 100 medal recipients. Two people, Ellsworth Bunker and Colin Powell, are two-time recipients of the Presidential Medal of Freedom. Colin Powell received his second award with Distinction, while Ellsworth Bunker was given both of his awards with distinction.

Eight Presidents have themselves received the medal at some point in their life. John F. Kennedy was posthumously awarded the Presidential Medal of Freedom in 1963. Lyndon B. Johnson was also posthumously awarded, in 1980. Ronald Reagan became the first living former president to get the award in 1993. Gerald Ford and Jimmy Carter were both given the Presidential Medal of Freedom in 1999. George H. W. Bush was given the award in 2011, and Bill Clinton in 2013. Joe Biden received the medal in 2017 when he was vice president, and is the first president to receive the medal before their presidency.

In 2015, President Barack Obama stated that there was no precedent to revoke a Presidential Medal of Freedom, regarding the award given to stand-up comedian and actor Bill Cosby. After being awarded the medal, Cosby was convicted of multiple counts of sexual assault, though the convictions were later overturned.

The Presidential Medal of Freedom is distinct from the Medal of Freedom, an antecedent award issued prior to 1963 to honor US civilian contributions to World War II.

At the age of 25, athlete and activist Simone Biles is the youngest person to receive this award as of 2022.

Declinations of the award 
Bill Belichick, coach of the New England Patriots, turned down the medal after the 2021 United States Capitol attack.

Country musician Dolly Parton turned down the medal twice. Parton said she turned it down the first time because her husband was ill, and the second time because of the COVID-19 pandemic.

List 

 † – Awarded posthumously
 WD – Awarded "With Distinction"

Awarded by John F. Kennedy 
John F. Kennedy selected 31 recipients to be awarded in 1963. After his assassination they were officially awarded by Lyndon B. Johnson.

Awarded by Lyndon B. Johnson 
Lyndon B. Johnson awarded 58 medals between 1963 and 1969, excluding 31 which were selected by John F. Kennedy.

Awarded by Richard Nixon 
Richard Nixon awarded 28 medals between 1969 and 1974.

Awarded by Gerald Ford 
Gerald Ford awarded 26 medals between 1974 and 1977.

Awarded by Jimmy Carter 
Jimmy Carter awarded 34 medals between 1977 and 1981.

Awarded by Ronald Reagan 
Ronald Reagan awarded 89 medals between 1981 and 1989.

Awarded by George H. W. Bush 
George H. W. Bush awarded 39 medals between 1989 and 1993.

Awarded by Bill Clinton 
Bill Clinton awarded 89 medals between 1993 and 2001.

Awarded by George W. Bush
George W. Bush awarded 83 medals between 2001 and 2009.

Awarded by Barack Obama 
Barack Obama awarded 117 medals between 2009 and 2017.

Awarded by Donald Trump 
Donald Trump awarded 24 medals between 2017 and 2021.

Awarded by Joe Biden

Notes

Bibliography 
  – contains a list of awardees from 1963 to approximately 1995

References

External links 

 Medal of Freedom, Official site for the Medal of Freedom for the Obama administration
 Presidential Medal of Freedom Recipients, 1963–2002 (alphabetical pp. 51–61, chronological pp. 62–69), The White House
 Presidential Medal of Freedom Recipients, 1993–2009, United States Senate
 Politicians Who Received the Medal of Freedom, The Political Graveyard

Presidential Medal of Freedom recipients
 List
Presidential Medal of Freedom recipients